In mathematics, summation is the addition of a sequence of any kind of numbers, called addends or summands; the result is their sum or total. Beside numbers, other types of values can be summed as well: functions, vectors, matrices, polynomials and, in general, elements of any type of mathematical objects on which an operation denoted "+" is defined.

Summations of infinite sequences are called series. They involve the concept of limit, and are not considered in this article.

The summation of an explicit sequence is denoted as a succession of additions. Because addition is associative and commutative, there is no need of parentheses, and the result is the same irrespective of the order of the summands. Summation of a sequence of only one element results in this element itself. Summation of an empty sequence (a sequence with no elements), by convention, results in 0.

Very often, the elements of a sequence are defined, through a regular pattern, as a function of their place in the sequence. For simple patterns, summation of long sequences may be represented with most summands replaced by ellipses. Otherwise, summation is denoted by using Σ notation, where  is an enlarged capital Greek letter sigma. For example, the sum of the first  natural numbers can be denoted as 

For long summations, and summations of variable length (defined with ellipses or Σ notation), it is a common problem to find closed-form expressions for the result. For example,

Although such formulas do not always exist, many summation formulas have been discovered—with some of the most common and elementary ones being listed in the remainder of this article.

Notation

Capital-sigma notation 

Mathematical notation uses a symbol that compactly represents summation of many similar terms: the summation symbol, an enlarged form of the upright capital Greek letter sigma. This is defined as

The index, is incremented by one for each successive term, stopping when .

Here is an example showing the summation of squares:

Alternatively, index and bounds of summation are sometimes omitted from the definition of summation if the context is sufficiently clear. This applies particularly when the index runs from 1 to n. For example, one might write that:

Generalizations of this notation are often used, in which an arbitrary logical condition is supplied, and the sum is intended to be taken over all values satisfying the condition. For example:

Similarly,

There are also ways to generalize the use of many sigma signs. For example,

is the same as

A similar notation is used for the product of a sequence, where , an enlarged form of the Greek capital letter pi, is used instead of

Special cases
It is possible to sum fewer than 2 numbers:
 If the summation has no summands, then the evaluated sum is zero, because zero is the identity for addition. This is known as the empty sum.

These degenerate cases are usually only used when the summation notation gives a degenerate result in a special case.
For example, if  in the definition above, then there is only one term in the sum; if , then there is none.

Formal definition 
Summation may be defined recursively as follows:
 

Measure theory notation
In the notation of measure and integration theory, a sum can be expressed as a definite integral,

Calculus of finite differences

Given a function  that is defined over the integers in the interval , the following equation holds:

This is the analogue of the fundamental theorem of calculus in calculus of finite differences, which states that:

where

An example of application of the above equation is the following: 

Using binomial theorem, this may be rewritten as: 

The above formula is more commonly used for inverting of the difference operator , defined by:

where  is a function defined on the nonnegative integers.
That is, 
This function is defined up to the addition of a constant, and may be chosen as

Approximation by definite integrals
Many such approximations can be obtained by the following connection between sums and integrals, which holds for any increasing function f:

and for any decreasing function f:

For more general approximations, see the Euler–Maclaurin formula.

For summations in which the summand is given (or can be interpolated) by an integrable function of the index, the summation can be interpreted as a Riemann sum occurring in the definition of the corresponding definite integral. One can therefore expect that for instance

However, for a given summation n is fixed, and little can be said about the error in the above approximation without additional assumptions about f: it is clear that for wildly oscillating functions the Riemann sum can be arbitrarily far from the Riemann integral.

Identities 
The formulae below involve finite sums; for infinite summations or finite summations of expressions involving trigonometric functions or other transcendental functions, see list of mathematical series.

General identities 
  (distributivity)
  (commutativity and associativity)
  (index shift)
  for a bijection  from a finite set  onto a  set  (index change); this generalizes the preceding formula.
  (splitting a sum, using associativity)
  (a variant of the preceding formula)
  (the sum from the first term up to the last is equal to the sum from the last down to the first)
  (a particular case of the formula above)
  (commutativity and associativity, again)
  (another application of commutativity and associativity)
  (splitting a sum into its odd and even parts, for even indexes)
  (splitting a sum into its odd and even parts, for odd indexes)
 (distributivity)
  (distributivity allows factorization)
  (the logarithm of a product is the sum of the logarithms of the factors)
  (the exponential of a sum is the product of the exponential of the summands)

Powers and logarithm of arithmetic progressions 
  for every  that does not depend on 
  (Sum of the simplest arithmetic progression, consisting of the first n natural numbers.)
  (Sum of first odd natural numbers)
  (Sum of first even natural numbers)
  (A sum of logarithms is the logarithm of the product)
  (Sum of the first squares, see square pyramidal number.) 
  (Nicomachus's theorem) 

More generally, one has Faulhaber's formula for 
 

Summation index in exponents 
In the following summations,  is assumed to be different from 1.

  (sum of a geometric progression)
  (special case for )
 
(sum of an arithmetico–geometric sequence)

Binomial coefficients and factorials 

There exist very many summation identities involving binomial coefficients (a whole chapter of Concrete Mathematics is devoted to just the basic techniques). Some of the most basic ones are the following.

Involving the binomial theorem
  the binomial theorem
  the special case where 
 , the special case where , which, for  expresses the sum of the binomial distribution

Involving permutation numbers
 
 
 , where  and  denotes the floor function.

Others

Harmonic numbers

  (the th harmonic number)
  (a generalized harmonic number)

Growth rates
The following are useful approximations (using theta notation):

  for real c greater than −1
 
  (See Harmonic number)
 
  for real c greater than 1
 
  for non-negative real c
 
  for non-negative real c, d
 
  for non-negative real b > 1, c, d

History

 In 1675, Gottfried Wilhelm Leibniz, in a letter to Henry Oldenburg, suggests the symbol ∫ to mark the sum of differentials (Latin: calculus summatorius), hence the S-shape. The renaming of this symbol to integral arose later in exchanges with Johann Bernoulli.
 In 1755, the summation symbol Σ is attested in Leonhard Euler's Institutiones calculi differentialis. Euler uses the symbol in expressions like:
 
 In 1772, usage of Σ and Σn is attested by Lagrange.
 In 1823, the capital letter S is attested as a summation symbol for series. This usage was apparently widespread.
 In 1829, the summation symbol Σ is attested by Fourier and C. G. J. Jacobi. Fourier's use includes lower and upper bounds, for example:

See also
 Capital-pi notation
 Einstein notation
 Iverson bracket
 Iterated binary operation
 Kahan summation algorithm
 Product (mathematics)
 Summation by parts
 ∑ the summation single glyph (U+2211 N-ARY SUMMATION)
 ⎲ the paired glyph's beginning (U+23B2 SUMMATION TOP)
 ⎳ the paired glyph's end (U+23B3 SUMMATION BOTTOM)

Notes

References

Bibliography

External links
 

Mathematical notation
Addition